Cristian Barros may refer to:
 Cristián Barros (born 1952), Chilean diplomat
 Cristian Barros (footballer) (born 2000), Uruguayan footballer